Kelechi Promise Nwanaga (born 24 December 1997) is a Nigerian javelin thrower.

As a junior she won the silver medal at the 2015 African Junior Championships. She won the gold medal at the 2015 African Games, finished fourth at the 2016 African Championships, sixth at the 2018 Commonwealth Games, won the gold medal at the 2018 African Championships and defended her gold medal at the 2019 African Games.

Nwanaga personal best throw is 58.15 metres, achieved in July 2017 in Ozoro, setting a new Nigerian record.

References

1997 births
Living people
Nigerian javelin throwers
Athletes (track and field) at the 2015 African Games
African Games gold medalists for Nigeria
Athletes (track and field) at the 2018 Commonwealth Games
Commonwealth Games competitors for Nigeria
African Games medalists in athletics (track and field)
Athletes (track and field) at the 2019 African Games
African Championships in Athletics winners
African Games gold medalists in athletics (track and field)
Florida State Seminoles women's track and field athletes